Appledore is a village and civil parish in the Ashford District of Kent, England. The village centre is on the northern edge of the Romney Marsh, 12 miles (19 km) south-west of Ashford town. The northerly part of this village is Appledore Heath.

History
The name Appledore comes from the Old English apuldre (meaning apple tree) and is first recorded in the 10th century. Although a Brythonic origin is more likely (given the widespread survival of Brythonic names in Kent) e.g. from or connected with "dwr/dor" meaning water.

Appledore was once a port on the estuary of the River Rother. Famously, the greater part of the Danish army (280 ships - 5000 men)  wintered at Appledore in 892–93, before moving into Wessex and suffering defeat at the hands of the Saxons led by King Alfred's son Edward the Elder at Farnham in Surrey. The defeated Danes fell back to Benfleet in Essex where they were again defeated in battle.
The importance of Appledore as a port diminished suddenly in the 13th-century when great storms caused the river Rother to change its course; the village street now leads down to the Royal Military Canal. A French raid in 1380 resulted in the burning of the church: it was later rebuilt. The village was permitted to hold a market in the main street by Edward II. In 1804, when there was threat of invasion by Napoleon the Royal Military Canal was built: Appledore stands on its northern bank. The Rhee Wall, a 13th-century waterway, was built to carry silt away from the eastern part of the Romney Marsh; it runs from Appledore to New Romney.

In film, the media and literature
Appledore was the setting A. A. Milne's famous verse poem, "The Knight Whose Armour Didn't Squeak".

The fictional village of Plummergen, in the "Miss Seeton" series of crime novels by Heron Carvic, is based on Appledore.

Appledore features in the series Darling Buds of May.

Religion
The medieval parish church is dedicated to Saints Peter and Paul.

Transport
The B2080 is a local road connecting Appledore with Tenterden and Brenzett, where it meets the A259 South Coast Trunk Road. The Royal Military Road follows the canal southwest from Appledore to Rye.

The line reduces from dual to single track beyond the station towards  and Hastings.

Education
St Augustine of Canterbury Catholic Primary School is located in the area.

Parkwood 

A car park is along the Woodchurch Road, heading north from Appledore towards Brattle.

It is managed by Kent County Council's Country Parks service.
It is noted for its bluebells in spring and for nightingales. There are woodland walks and panoramic views over Appledore and Romney Marshes.

The woodland is frequently coppiced for various timber uses. Including oak thinnings being used in Shorne Wood Country Parks new visitor centre, as the window and roof joinery.

The wood, is surrounded by three other woods, Great Heron Wood (to the North), Little Heron Wood (to the East) and Butness Wood (further to the East).

References

External links
 
 KentGuide's comprehensive page about Appledore
 

Villages in Kent
Villages in the Borough of Ashford
Civil parishes in Ashford, Kent